Koh Chieng Mun (born on 16 December 1960) is a Singaporean actress and comedian. She is best known for her role as Dolly Tan on the Singaporean sitcom Under One Roof. In 2018 she was cast in the American romantic comedy-drama film Crazy Rich Asians.

Early life 
Koh Chieng Mun is the third of four children. She grew up in Outram Park, Singapore.

Career 
In the 1990s, Koh played the role of Miss La La on The Ra Ra Show. From 1995 to 2003 she portrayed Dolly Tan on the English-language Singaporean sitcom Under One Roof. In 1998 Koh played Mrs. Chan Ai Ling in the film That's the Way I Like It. In 2001 she was cast as Ronda on the television sitcom Living with Lydia. In 2003 she was cast as Betty in the comedy film City Sharks. In 2005 she performed in Toy Factory's stage production 10 Brother. She also worked as a radio host for Symphony 92.4FM.

In June 2014 she performed with the theatre company Generasia in Women of Asia, a live production at LASALLE College of the Arts.

In early 2018 it was announced that Koh would be joining the cast of Toggle's original series Dance With Me.

She was cast as Neena Goh in the 2018 American romantic comedy-drama film Crazy Rich Asians, based on the novel of the same name by Kevin Kwan. She was the only cast member to speak in Singlish in the film.

Filmography

Films

Television

Awards 
 Star Awards 2002 Top 10 Most Popular Female Artists

Personal life 
On 31 October 2005, Koh was diagnosed with breast cancer, with tumors in her breasts and her left kidney. Both tumors were successfully removed during a surgical procedure on 11 November 2005. She is now cancer free, and is a spokesperson for the Singapore Cancer Society.

She is a practicing Roman Catholic.

References

External links 
 
 Koh Chieng Mun

Living people
20th-century Singaporean actresses
21st-century Singaporean actresses
Singaporean film actresses
Singaporean stage actresses
Singaporean television actresses
Singaporean Roman Catholics
Singaporean women comedians
1960 births
Singaporean comedians
Singaporean people of Chinese descent